Fenton Run is a  long 1st order tributary to Bilger Run in Clearfield County, Pennsylvania. It is the only stream with this name in the United States. 

Like all of the other tributaries flowing into Kratzer Run, Fenton Run has been impacted by acid mine drainage (AMD). Over the past thirty years, however, stream conditions have improved, and Fenton Run now supports fish life.

Course 
 Fenton Run rises about 0.5 miles north-northwest of Grampian, Pennsylvania, and then flows northeast and turns southeast to join Bilger Run about 0.75 miles west of Stronach.

Watershed 
Fenton Run drains  of area, receives about 43.6 in/year of precipitation, has a wetness index of 381.35, and is about 65% forested.

See also 
 List of Pennsylvania Rivers

References 

Rivers of Pennsylvania
Rivers of Clearfield County, Pennsylvania